Lørenskog Idrettsforening is a Norwegian football club from Lørenskog, founded in 1929 as a merger between Lørenskogkameratene and Solheim IF. Most of the time the club has played in the Norwegian Second Division, with a short spell in the Norwegian First Division in 2002.

Notable former players for the club include John Carew, Henning Berg, Espen Olsen, Kim Holmen, Johan Nås and Abdisalam Ibrahim.

Recent history 

{|class="wikitable"
|-bgcolor="#efefef"
! Season
! 
! Pos.
! Pl.
! W
! D
! L
! GS
! GA
! P
!Cup
!Notes
|-
|2006
|2. divisjon
|align=right |3
|align=right|26||align=right|17||align=right|3||align=right|6
|align=right|78||align=right|36||align=right|54
||Second round
|
|-
|2007
|2. divisjon
|align=right|4
|align=right|26||align=right|12||align=right|10||align=right|4
|align=right|58||align=right|33||align=right|46
||First round
|
|-
|2008
|2. divisjon
|align=right |2
|align=right|26||align=right|16||align=right|3||align=right|7
|align=right|48||align=right|27||align=right|51
||Second round
|
|-
|2009
|2. divisjon
|align=right|5
|align=right|26||align=right|13||align=right|6||align=right|7
|align=right|55||align=right|37||align=right|45
||Second round
|
|-
|2010
|2. divisjon
|align=right |7
|align=right|26||align=right|11||align=right|3||align=right|12
|align=right|56||align=right|55||align=right|36
||First round
|
|-
|2011 
|2. divisjon
|align=right |4
|align=right|26||align=right|12||align=right|7||align=right|7
|align=right|55||align=right|46||align=right|43
||Third round
|
|-
|2012 
|2. divisjon
|align=right |2
|align=right|26||align=right|16||align=right|3||align=right|7
|align=right|51||align=right|39||align=right|51
||Second round
|
|-
|2013
|2. divisjon
|align=right |10
|align=right|26||align=right|8||align=right|7||align=right|11
|align=right|49||align=right|56||align=right|31
||First round
|
|-
|2014
|2. divisjon
|align=right |11
|align=right|26||align=right|7||align=right|5||align=right|14
|align=right|36||align=right|64||align=right|26
||Second round
|
|-
|2015
|2. divisjon
|align=right |9
|align=right|26||align=right|9||align=right|6||align=right|11
|align=right|47||align=right|40||align=right|33
||First round
|
|-
|2016
|2. divisjon
|align=right bgcolor="#FFCCCC"|10
|align=right|26||align=right|8||align=right|4||align=right|14
|align=right|41||align=right|49||align=right|28
||First round
|Relegated to 3. divisjon
|-
|2017
|3. divisjon
|align=right|5
|align=right|26||align=right|12||align=right|5||align=right|9
|align=right|54||align=right|36||align=right|41
||First round
|
|-
|2018
|3. divisjon
|align=right|3
|align=right|26||align=right|17||align=right|4||align=right|5
|align=right|58||align=right|34||align=right|55
||Second round
|
|}

References

External links
 Official site
 Rolvsrud Stadion - Nordic Stadiums

Football clubs in Norway
Sport in Akershus
Lørenskog
Association football clubs established in 1929
1929 establishments in Norway